The Church of la Asunción de Nuestra Señora (Spanish: Iglesia de la Asunción de Nuestra Señora) is a church located in Algete, Spain. It was declared Bien de Interés Cultural in the Spanish heritage register in 2001.

References

External links
 Visita de la iglesia Ntra. Sra. de la Asunción - Algete - M.Alcobendas 2011

Nuestra Senora, Algete
Bien de Interés Cultural landmarks in the Community of Madrid